Khot Valley is an inhabited valley in the Hindukush range in Chitral, Pakistan. Its main town is Khot and the population speak Khowar language.

Schools 
 SalIk School and College
 Govt. Secondary School Khot
 Khot Science and Arts Degree College
 Aga Khan High School for Girls
 Madrasa Taleem ul Quran (Jamia Masjid Gesu)

Valleys of Khyber Pakhtunkhwa
Chitral District